Cuscal Limited is an Australian company that predominantly provides transactional banking, liquidity and capital management services and products to institutional customers including credit unions, mutual banks and superannuation funds. Cuscal is regulated by the Australian Prudential Regulation Authority (APRA) as an Australian authorised deposit-taking institution (ADI), and by the Australian Securities & Investments Commission (ASIC). It is a member of EFTPOS Payments Australia and the Australian Payments Clearing Association. Cuscal has an A+ credit rating.

Cuscal was established in 1992 as the Credit Union Services Corporation Limited and became Credit Union Services Corporation (Australia) Limited before changing its name to Cuscal Limited in December 2005. Cuscal replaced the state based credit union bodies, which had been in operation since 1956. Cuscal was incorporated as a Special Service Provider (SSP) under the financial institutions scheme, and assumed a role of providing liquidity and balance sheet support, in addition to aggregated access to money markets, to the mutual banking industry through its treasury function.

In 1994, Cuscal released the Credit Union Code of Practice. Until the Credit Union Industry Association (CUIA) and the Australia Association of Permanent Building Societies (AAPBS) merged to form a new joint industry association in 2006, the Association of Building Societies and Credit Unions (Abacus – Australian Mutuals) now the Customer Owned Banking Association (COBA), Cuscal also assumed the role of a trade association for Australian credit unions and co-operatives.

In 2014, Cuscal acquired Strategic Payments Services.

Services 
Cuscal's services include:

 electronic and paper payment processing including Acquiring, eftpos, ATMs, NPP, Apple Pay, Google Pay, direct entry, BPAY and member and corporate chequing
 card products (including rediCARD debit and Visa debit and credit cards)
 specialised credit union finance facilities
 network communication services
 development of payments infrastructure
 Velocity Global Wallet prepaid Visa product.

Treasury services include:
 mortgage securitisation services
 liquidity management and settlement services
 fixed interest / debt securities: Commonwealth bonds, Semi-government bonds, Corporate bonds, Commercial paper, Asset-backed securities
 interest rate derivatives: Fixed rate bills, Fixed rate agreements, Interest rate swaps
 financing products including standby letters of credit and guarantees
 bilateral loan facilities
 tradeable security brokerage services
 market and liquidity risk management advisory services
 fixed income portfolio management services

References

External links
 
 Company Overview of Cuscal Limited

Credit unions of Australia
Companies based in Sydney
Cooperative federations
Neobanks